Tom Phillipe Duquesnoy (born June 21, 1993, in Lens, Pas-de-Calais, France) is a retired French mixed martial artist. He is the former undisputed BAMMA Featherweight Champion and undisputed BAMMA Bantamweight Champion, and fought in the bantamweight division of the Ultimate Fighting Championship (UFC).

He is known for his quick striking and dynamic style. In 2015, Duquesnoy was named the #1 featherweight prospect in the world and "one of the very best talents in all of MMA", and was ranked the #1 prospect worldwide in all of MMA for both 2016 and 2017.

Early martial arts career

Tom Duquesnoy was born in Lens, France, and grew up there until he moved to Paris when he was 18. His grandparents had moved to Lens from Poland after World War II, hoping to find work in the city's coal mines. After the mines closed in the 1960s, the residents moved on to other pursuits. Duquesnoy's father encouraged him to learn martial arts to protect himself, and he began training in sambo at the age of 12. He eventually became interested in other forms of martial arts, including boxing, wrestling, and muay Thai. When he turned 18, his father offered to pay for a year of living and training in Paris, on the condition that Duquesnoy could prove he could make a career from fighting. Duquesnoy went on to have a successful amateur career, with a record of 7-1, and made his professional debut in February 2012. Despite suffering his only loss in February 2013, Duquesnoy has continued to fight and win in various combat sports.

Mixed martial arts career

Early career
After moving to Paris, Duquesnoy fought as an amateur and compiled a 7–1 record before turning professional in February 2012.

Duquesnoy made his professional MMA debut in February 2012. Over the next five years he fought at various events across Europe and amassed a record of 14 wins, one loss and one No Contest.

Ultimate Fighting Championship

Duquesnoy made his promotional debut against Patrick Williams on April 16, 2017 at UFC on Fox 24. After nearly finishing Williams at the end of the first round, he won the fight via TKO in the opening minute of the second round.

Duquesnoy faced Cody Stamann on October 7, 2017, at UFC 216. He lost the fight by split decision.

Duquesnoy faced Terrion Ware on March 17, 2018, at UFC Fight Night 127. He won the fight by unanimous decision.

Duquesnoy was scheduled to face Nathaniel Wood on December 29, 2018 at UFC 232. However, Duquesnoy pulled out of the fight on November 12 citing a rib injury.

On May 12, 2019 Duquesnoy announced his retirement from professional MMA competition.

Personal life
Duquesnoy's moniker "Fire Kid" was coined for his explosive energy who has a very young appearance for a fighter.

Championships and accomplishments

Mixed martial arts
BAMMA
BAMMA World Featherweight Championship (One time)
Three Successful Title Defences
BAMMA World Bantamweight Championship (One time)
One Successful Title Defence
Killa-Cam Featherweight World Champion (One time)
BB-Beatdown Featherweight GP Champion (One time)

Mixed martial arts record

|-
|Win
|align=center|16–2 (1)
|Terrion Ware
|Decision (unanimous)
|UFC Fight Night: Werdum vs. Volkov 
|
|align=center|3
|align=center|5:00
|London, England
|
|-
|Loss
|align=center|15–2 (1)
|Cody Stamann
|Decision (split)
|UFC 216 
|
|align=center|3
|align=center|5:00
|Las Vegas, Nevada, United States
|
|-
| Win
| align=center| 15–1 (1)
| Patrick Williams
| TKO (elbow and punch)
| UFC on Fox: Johnson vs. Reis
| 
| align=center| 2
| align=center| 0:28
| Kansas City, Missouri, United States
| 
|-
| Win
| align=center| 14–1 (1)
| Alan Philpott
| Submission (rear-naked choke)
| BAMMA 27
| 
| align=center| 2
| align=center| 3:35
| Dublin, Ireland
| 
|-
| Win
| align=center| 13–1 (1)
| Shay Walsh
| KO (elbow)
| BAMMA 25
| 
| align=center| 1
| align=center| 1:15
| Birmingham, England
| 
|-
| Win
| align=center| 12–1 (1)
| Damien Rooney
| KO (punch)
| BAMMA 24
| 
| align=center| 1
| align=center| 1:22
| Dublin, Ireland
|  
|-
| Win
| align=center| 11–1 (1)
| Brendan Loughnane
| Decision (split)
| BAMMA 22
| 
| align=center| 3
| align=center| 5:00
| Dublin, Ireland
|  
|-
| Win
| align=center| 10–1 (1)
| Krzysztof Klaczek
| TKO (body kick and punches)
| BAMMA 18
| 
| align=center| 3
| align=center| 1:37
| Wolverhampton, England
| 
|-
| NC
| align=center| 9–1 (1)
| Ashleigh Grimshaw
| NC (accidental groin kick)
| BAMMA 16
| 
| align=center| 1
| align=center| 0:11
| Manchester, England
| 
|-
| Win
| align=center| 9–1
| Teddy Violet
| Submission (triangle choke)
| BAMMA 15
| 
| align=center| 2
| align=center| 1:29
| London, England
| 
|-
| Win
| align=center| 8–1
| James Saville
| TKO (punches and elbows)
| BAMMA 14
| 
| align=center| 2
| align=center| 4:04
| Birmingham, England
| 
|-
| Win
| align=center| 7–1
| Scott Hunt
| TKO (punches)
| Killacam Promotions 6: Mercenaries
| 
| align=center| 1
| align=center| 0:34
| Margate, England
| 
|-
| Win
| align=center| 6–1
| Azdren Thaqi
| Submission (guillotine choke)
| Belgium Beatdown 4
| 
| align=center| 2
| align=center| 0:19
| Brussels, Belgium
| 
|-
| Win
| align=center| 5–1
| Evgeniy Odnorog
| Decision (unanimous)
| Belgium Beatdown 4
| 
| align=center| 3
| align=center| 5:00
| Brussels, Belgium
| 
|-
| Loss
| align=center| 4–1
| Makwan Amirkhani
| Technical Submission (D'Arce choke)
| Cage 21: Turku 2
| 
| align=center| 1
| align=center| 2:30
| Turku, Finland
|
|-
| Win
| align=center| 4–0
| Andrew Elliott
| Submission (guillotine choke)
| Killacam Promotions 5: Apocalypse
| 
| align=center| 1
| align=center| 0:35
| Margate, England
| 
|-
| Win
| align=center| 3–0
| Mickael Ignaczak
| TKO (punches)
| Hard Fighting Championship 5
| 
| align=center| 2
| align=center| 2:00
| Bruchsal, Germany
| 
|-
| Win
| align=center| 2–0
| Manuel Collet
| Decision (unanimous)
| Shooto Belgium: International MMA Open
| 
| align=center| 2
| align=center| 5:00
| Charleroi, Belgium
| 
|-
| Win
| align=center| 1–0
| Aboubacar Askabov
| TKO (punches)
| HFC: Contender
| 
| align=center| 1
| align=center| 4:15
| Bruchsal, Germany
|

See also
 List of current UFC fighters
 List of male mixed martial artists

References

External links 
 
 

1993 births
People from Lens, Pas-de-Calais
French male mixed martial artists
Bantamweight mixed martial artists
Living people
Featherweight mixed martial artists
French sambo practitioners
French Muay Thai practitioners
French practitioners of Brazilian jiu-jitsu
Sportspeople from Pas-de-Calais
Ultimate Fighting Championship male fighters
Mixed martial artists utilizing sambo
Mixed martial artists utilizing boxing
Mixed martial artists utilizing Muay Thai
Mixed martial artists utilizing wrestling
Mixed martial artists utilizing Brazilian jiu-jitsu